Moh Sarengat Stadium is the name of a football stadium in the town of Batang, Batang Regency, Central Java, Indonesia. It was named after a former athlete from the local neighbourhood who once broke a new Asian sprint record (10.4 seconds) in the Asian Games IV held in 1962 in Jakarta. Mr. Sarengat was regarded as the fastest runner in Asia for his achievement. People in Batang and its surroundings have always been very proud of him that they finally took his name as the name of the local stadium.

References

Football venues in Indonesia
Buildings and structures in Central Java
Sport in Central Java